L'Ormindo is an opera in a prologue and three acts by Francesco Cavalli to an original Italian libretto by Giovanni Faustini. The manuscript score is held at the Biblioteca Marciana in Venice, while a copy of the original libretto has been digitized by the Library of Congress. The opera has set numbers with recitative, and is set in Anfa (Casablanca), in the Mauri kingdom of Fessa (Fez).

Performance history
Ormindo was first performed in 1644 at the Teatro San Cassiano, Venice, the world's first public opera house. After its 1644 run, it was probably not revived until 1967 when it was performed at Glyndebourne Festival Opera.
The version presented at Glyndebourne was arranged and conducted by Raymond Leppard. The work received its American premiere in 1968 in a performance at the Juilliard School supervised by Leppard.   Subsequently it was performed by the Washington Opera Society, using Juilliard's sets and Costumes.  Singers were as follows: Amida -John Reardon; Erice - Michael Best; Ormindo - Frank Poretta; Sicle -Evelyn Mandac; Erisbe- Benita Valente.

The United States premiere of the opera was given by the Juilliard Opera Theatre at Lincoln Center in New York City on April 25, 1968 with a cast that included Grayson Hirst in the title role,  Robert Shiesley as Amida, Alan Ord as Hariadeno, Barbara Shuttleworth as Erisbe, Joanna Bruno as Nerillo, Wilma Shakesnider as Sicle, Michael Best as Erice, Anita Terzian Titus as Mirinda, and Alan Titus as Osmano.

Although taken up by the State Opera of South Australia and staged in 1980, the opera remains something of a rarity. A recent performance was by the Pittsburgh Opera in February, 2007, using a new performing edition by Peter Foster. It was conducted by Bernard McDonald and directed by Chas Rader-Shieber.  Peter Foster's edition was also used by The Harvard Early Music Society in its November, 2008 performance of the work, conducted by Matthew Hall and directed by Roy Kimmey.  The Baylor University School of Music performed the work in English on November 21–22, 2008 under the direction of Dr. Michael Johnson with conductor Dr. Andrew Hudson. It was performed by Pinchgut Opera of Sydney in December 2009. The Royal Opera staged a new production, in an English translation, directed by Kasper Holten at Shakespeare's Globe in March 2014 - the first opera production at the newly opened Sam Wanamaker Playhouse. This production was revived the following year (in February 2015) at the same venue. The Royal Irish Academy of Music based in Dublin presented the first Irish production of the opera in January 2015 directed by Ben Barnes and conducted by David Adams.

Roles

Synopsis
Setting: Anfa, a city of the Kingdom of Fessa in Mauretania.
The Maghreb princes, Amida and Ormindo, who are assisting in the defense of Mauretania, are both in love with Erisbe who is unhappily married to Hariadeno, Fessa's elderly king. The princes agree to remain friends while they test her love. During the course of the opera, there is much plotting by Amore, Princess Sicle (Amida's abandoned lover) and Erice (Sicle's nurse) to interfere with the contest. Erice stages a séance to communicate with the 'dead' Sicle who reproaches Amida for his inconstancy which had driven her to suicide. Amida, overcome with remorse, realizes that he still loves Princess Sicle and is overjoyed when it is revealed that she is actually alive and not a ghost. Meanwhile, Erisbe and Ormindo decide to elope to Tunis, where Ormindo must defend his homeland from attack. When King Hariadeno discovers their adultery, he orders his captain, Osmano, to have them poisoned. However, Osmano substitutes a sleeping potion for the poison at the urging of Mirinda (Erisbe's confidante) who has promised to marry him if he spares the lovers. All ends more or less happily when the King learns that Ormindo is actually his son from a youthful liaison. He forgives everyone and cedes his kingdom to Ormindo.

Recordings
Complete
Cavalli: L'Ormindo (John Wakefield, tenor; Peter-Christoph Runge, baritone; Hanneke van Bork, soprano; Anne Howells, mezzo-soprano; Federico Davia, bass; Jean Allister, contralto London Philharmonic Orchestra; Raymond Leppard, conductor). Recorded at the Glyndebourne Festival Opera House. Label: (1967) Argo
Cavalli: L'Ormindo (Howard Crook, tenor; Dominique Visse, countertenor; Sandrine Piau, soprano; Martin Oro, countertenor; Les Paladins, ensemble; Jérôme Correas, harpsichord and conductor). Label: (studio, June 2006) Pan Classics
Excerpts
Cavalli: Arias and Duets from Didone, Egisto, Ormindo, Giasone and Callisto (Mario Cecchetti, tenor; Rosita Frisani, soprano; Gloria Banditelli, mezzo-soprano; Mediterraneo Concento, ensemble; Sergio Vartolo, conductor). Label: Naxos

References

Sources
Daolmi, Davide, Ormindo, L', in Gelli, Piero and Poletti, Filippo (eds), Dizionario dell'opera 2008, Milan, Baldini Castoldi Dalai, 2007, pp. 948–949. 
Glynias, Marissa A., "Hargis Broaches Baroque Opera", The Harvard Crimson, November 7, 2008. Accessed 12 November 2008.
Henahan, Donal, "Opera: L'Ormindo", New York Times, August 20, 1982. Accessed 12 November 2008.
McDonald, Bernard. "Cavalli's Ormindo: Tonality and Sexuality in Seventeenth-Century Venice." MMus thesis, University of Glasgow, 2010.
Pittsburgh Opera, Program notes for the company's 2007 performance. Accessed 12 November 2008.
Vartolo, Sergio, Liner notes for Cavalli: Arias and Duets from Didone, Egisto, Ormindo, Giasone and Callisto, Naxos Records. Accessed 12 November 2008.

External links
Libretto online
Full manuscript score from Biblioteca Marchiana

Italian-language operas
Operas by Francesco Cavalli
Operas
1644 operas